Marie-Victorin is a provincial electoral district in Quebec, Canada that elects members to the National Assembly of Quebec. The district is located in the Vieux-Longueuil Borough of Longueuil. It is bordered to the north by chemin de Chambly, to the east by the city limits, to the south by the Canadian National railway, Boulevard Deslauniers and the city limits and to the west by the Saint Lawrence River.

It was created for the 1981 election from parts of Laporte and Taillon electoral districts.

In the change from the 2001 to the 2011 electoral map, it gained some territory from Taillon.

It was named after Brother Marie-Victorin, a Quebec botanist.

Members of the National Assembly

Election results

 

^ Change is from redistributed results. CAQ change is from ADQ.

^ QS change is from UFP.

^ UFP change is from Socialist Democracy.

|-
 
|Innovator 
| Jimmy Audet
|align="right"|179 
|align="right"|0.59
|
|-

|-
 
|Pour la république du Canada
| Alain Gauthier 
|align="right"|197
|align="right"|0.78
|align="right"|+0.46

|-
 
|Parti indépendantiste
| Omer Thériault
|align="right"|346 
|align="right"|1.31
|-
 
|United Social Credit
| Bella Forget Bélanger
|align="right"|122
|align="right"|0.46

|-
 
|Christian Socialist
| Nicole Morse
|align="right"|83 
|align="right"|0.32

58 year old former priest Guy Pratt, the son of former Longueuil mayor Paul Pratt was the Liberal candidate. He took on 33 year old Longueuil alderman Pierre Nantel who ran for the PQ.

|-
 
|Parti république du Québec
| Jean-Paul Ménard
|align="right"|120 
|align="right"|0.61

References

External links
Information
 Elections Quebec

Election results
 Election results (National Assembly)

Maps
 2011 map (PDF)
 2001 map (Flash)
2001–2011 changes (Flash)
1992–2001 changes (Flash)
 Electoral map of Montérégie region
 Quebec electoral map, 2011

Politics of Longueuil
Marie-Victorin